"Return of Django" is a 1969 instrumental by the Upsetters, a studio band, led by Lee "Scratch" Perry, who wrote and produced the song. Backed with "Dollar in the Teeth", it made #5 on the UK Singles Chart.

Use in popular culture
Grand Theft Auto: London 1969 uses both Return of Django and Dollar in the Teeth on one of its stations.
Return of Django appears in the film This Is England.
The UK Inland Revenue used this for an advert in 2004.

References

1960s instrumentals
1969 singles
1969 songs
Songs written by Lee "Scratch" Perry